Ibacitabine (or ibacitabin, or 5-iodo-2'-deoxycytidine ) is an antiviral drug. It is topically applied to treat herpes labialis.

References

External links
 

Antiviral drugs
Pyrimidones
Organoiodides